Kenneth T. Welch (born August 15, 1964) is an American politician serving as mayor of St. Petersburg, Florida. A member of the Democratic Party, Welch served on the county commission of Pinellas County, Florida. Welch is the city’s first African-American mayor.

Early life and education
Welch was born August 15, 1964, in St. Petersburg, Florida. His father, David, is a former member of the St. Petersburg city council and founded an accounting company, where Ken worked.

Welch is a third-generation St. Petersburg resident who attended Melrose and Bay Point Elementary, Bay Point Middle School, and Lakewood Senior High School. He later attended University of South Florida where he studied accounting and received his bachelor's degree. He received his Master of Business Administration from Florida A&M University.

Career
After college, Welch returned to St. Petersburg as an accountant for Florida Power Corporation. He also served as Technology Manager for his father's small accounting firm. After years of community service, Ken became the first Commissioner elected to represent County Commission District 7 in St. Petersburg, only the second African American commissioner in the history of Pinellas County. He served on the county commission for 20 years. The Tampa Bay Times criticized him for lobbying on behalf of his wife after she was fired from a publicly funded faith based reading program. Questions were raised over expenditures she made on behalf of the organization.

Welch ran for mayor of St. Petersburg in the 2021 election. He defeated Robert Blackmon in the general election on November 2, and was sworn in to the role on January 6, 2022. He announced the cancellation of a previous request for proposals (RFP) for the Tropicana Field site where the Tampa Bay Rays play. Welch said a new RFP would include a stadium for the Rays and affordable housing.

Personal life
Welch and his wife, Donna, have two daughters.

References

External links
City of St. Petersburg - Mayor Ken Welch
 

1964 births
County commissioners in Florida
Florida A&M University alumni
Florida Democrats
Living people
Place of birth missing (living people)
University of South Florida alumni
Mayors of St. Petersburg, Florida
African-American mayors in Florida